Make It Hot is the debut studio album by American singer Nicole Wray. The album was released in August 1998 through Missy Elliott's Elektra-distributed vanity label, The Goldmind. The album was produced by Missy Elliott and Timbaland. Some editions of the release credit Nicole as Nicole Ray, an artist name she only used here and on her single "I Can't See".

Critical reception 

Michael Gallucci from AllMusic gave Make It Hot "is virtually a textbook primer on Elliott's stylistic touch and influence on end-of-the-millennium hip-hop (she raps on, writes songs for, produces, and executive produces Make It Hot – and it's on her custom label). Along with pal Timbaland, Elliott transforms young Nicole's somewhat standard bow into a stuttering slab of post-rap R&B that's as sleekly modern as it is customarily cold." Entertainment Weekly journalist Rob Brunner gave the album a B rating and concluded: "Even if the distinctive Missy-Timbaland sound is getting a little old, Hot proves the formula hasn’t gone cold just yet."

Chart performance 
Make It Hot reached number forty-two on the US Billboard 200 and number nineteen on the R&B album chart. The first single, "Make It Hot", reached number five on the Hot 100 chart, number two on the R&B singles chart, and was certified gold. The second single, "I Can't See", reached number thirty-six on the Rhythmic Top 40 chart. In 1999, the third and final single from the album, "Eyes Better Not Wander", reached number seventy-one on the R&B singles chart.

Track listing

Limited Edition bonus disc 
 Clipse - "We Get Money (Got Caught, Pt. 2)"
 Flipmode Squad - "Everything"
 Yo Yo - "Do You Wanna Ride?"
 Missy Elliott - "Get Contact" 1
 Coko - "He Be Back" 1
 En Vogue - "No Fool No More"
1 Denotes demo version

Personnel
Credits are taken from the album's liner notes.

Instruments and performances

 Davis Barnett – viola
 Larry Gold – cello
 Donald "Lenny" Holmes – bass, guitar
 Emma Kummrow – violin

 Brian Morgan – keyboard
 Nat The Great – beatbox
 Igor Sewic – violin

Technical and production
 Executive producers: Missy Elliott, Merlin Bobb, Sylvia Rhone
 Producers: Big Baby, Merlin Bobb, Missy Elliott, Kevin Hicks, Donald Holmes, Brian Alexander Morgan, Tim Mosley, Sylvia Rhone, Smokey, Suga Mike, Timbaland
 Vocal producer: Nicole Wray
 Vocal assistance: Missy Elliott
 Engineers: Claude "Swifty" Achille, Jimmy Douglas, Paul Falcone, Nat Foster, Eddie Hudson, Ted Reiger, Jon Smeltz, Stevie Sola
 Assistant engineers: Chuck Bailey, Steve Macauley, Rob Murphy, Jason Rea
 Mixing: Claude "Swifty" Achille, Kevin Davis, Jimmy Douglas, Paul Falcone, Nat Foster, Senator Jimmy D
 Programming: Timbaland
 Mastering: Herb Powers
 Arranger: Missy Elliott, Nat Foster, Larry Gold, Brian Morgan,

Charts

Release history

References 

1998 debut albums
Nicole Wray albums
The Goldmind Inc. albums
Albums produced by Missy Elliott
Albums produced by Timbaland